Trainee Cupid is the first Standard Chinese album by Hong Kong Cantopop girl group, Twins, released in 2005 by Emperor Entertainment Group. Various versions of this album exist, including of Hong Kong (3 version), Taiwan (3 version), Singapore/Malaysia (2 version) and China (2 version) versions. Also karaoke DVD and VCD versions of Trainee Cupid, featuring music videos of the songs listed below with few extra bonus videos, was released in August 2005.

The music video for Starlight Amusement features Taiwanese artist Danson Tang.

The tracks Trainee Cupid and Starlight Amusement were nominated for Top 10 Gold Songs at the Hong Kong TVB8 Awards, presented by television station TVB8, in 2005.

Track listing

Note: All track in Standard Chinese (Mandarin Chinese) unless otherwise stated

References

2005 albums
Twins (group) albums
Mandopop albums